Blas Ramón Rubio Lara (born 13 December 1950) is a Mexican politician affiliated with the PRI. As of 2013 he served as Deputy of the LXII Legislature of the Mexican Congress representing Sinaloa.

References

1950 births
Living people
Politicians from Sinaloa
People from Guasave
Institutional Revolutionary Party politicians
21st-century Mexican politicians
Deputies of the LXII Legislature of Mexico
Members of the Chamber of Deputies (Mexico) for Sinaloa